Unified growth theory was developed in light of the failure of endogenous growth theory to capture key empirical regularities in the growth processes and their contribution to the momentous rise in inequality across nations in the past two centuries. Unlike earlier growth theories that have focused entirely on the modern growth regime, unified growth theory captures the growth process over the entire course of human existence, highlighting the critical role of the differential timing of the transition from Malthusian stagnation to sustained economic growth in the emergence of inequality across countries and regions.

Unified growth theory was first advanced by Oded Galor and his co-authors who were able to characterize in a single dynamical system a phase transition from an epoch of Malthusian stagnation to an era of sustained economic growth. Due to the evolution of latent state variables during the Malthusian epoch, the stable Malthusian equilibrium ultimately vanishes, and the system gradually converges to a modern growth steady-state equilibrium. The Malthusian steady-state equilibrium is characterized by slow pace of technological progress and population growth, where the potential impact of technological progress on the standard of living is offset in the long-run by population growth. In contrast, during the modern growth regime, technological progress triggers investment in human capital along with a fertility decline, further spurring technological progress, and permitting sustained growth in the standard of living.

The theory captures the fundamental phases of the process of development: (i) the Malthusian epoch that was prevalent over most of human history, (ii) the escape from the Malthusian trap, (iii) the emergence of human capital as a central element in the growth process, (iv) the onset of the fertility decline, (v) the origins of the modern era of sustained economic growth, and (vi) the roots of divergence in income per capita across nations in the past two centuries.

Unified growth theory suggests that during most of human existence, technological progress was offset by population growth, and living standards were near subsistence across time and space. However, the reinforcing interaction between the rate of technological progress and the size and composition of the population has gradually increased the pace of technological progress, enhancing the importance of education in the ability of individuals to adapt to the changing technological environment. The rise in the allocation of resources towards education triggered a fertility decline enabling economies to allocate a larger share of the fruits of technological progress to a steady increase in income per capita, rather than towards the growth of population, paving the way for the emergence of sustained economic growth. The theory further suggests that variations in biogeographical characteristics, as well as cultural and institutional characteristics, have generated a differential pace of transition from stagnation to growth across countries and consequently divergence in their income per capita over the past two centuries 

The testable predictions of the theory and its underlying mechanisms have been confirmed in empirical and quantitative research in the past decade, and have inspired intensive exploration of the impact of historical and pre-historical forces on comparative economic development and the disparity in the wealth of nations: (a) the positive long-run effect of technological progress on population growth, but not on income per capita, during the Malthusian epoch was confirmed based on data across countries; (b) the positive effect of technological progress on human capital formation in early phases on industrialization was confirmed based on data from England and France; (c) the effect of the rise in the demand for human capital on the fertility decline was confirmed based on the demographic transitions in China, England, France, Ireland, and Prussia; (d) the theory as a whole was explored quantitatively.

In addition, Unified growth theory explores the interaction between the evolution of the composition of human traits and the growth process. In particular, it advances the hypothesis that evolutionary forces  had a significant role in the evolution of the world economy from stagnation to growth. The theory suggests that the Malthusian pressure, via the forces of natural selection, have shaped the composition of the human population. Traits that were complementary to the technological environment generated higher level of income, and therefore higher reproductive success, and the gradual proliferation of these traits in the population contributed to the growth process and ultimately to the take-off from an epoch of stagnation to the modern era of sustained growth. The testable predictions of this evolutionary theory and its underlying mechanisms have been confirmed empirically and quantitatively.

Unified growth theory contributes to Macrohistory. It sheds light on the divergence in income per capita across the globe during the past two centuries. It identifies the factors that have governed the transition from stagnation to growth and have thus contributed to the observed worldwide differences in economic development. It highlights the persistent effects that variations in historical and prehistorical conditions have had on the composition of human capital and economic development across countries. Finally, it uncovers the forces that have led to the emergence of convergence clubs.

References 

Macroeconomic theories